The 28th Annual Bengal Film Journalists' Association Awards were held on 1965, honoring the best in Indian cinema in 1964.

Main Awards

Best Indian Films (In Order of Merit)
 Charulata
 Arohi
 Dosti
 Shehar Aur Sapna
 Pratinidhi
 Jatugriha
 Anustup Chhanda
 Door Gagan Ki Chhaon Men
 Jiban Kahini
 Sangam

Best Director
Satyajit Ray - Charulata

Best Actor
Sailen Mukherjee - Charulata

Best Actress
Madhabi Mukherjee - Charulata

Best Actor in Supporting Role
Anil Chatterjee - Sandhya Deeper Sikha

Best Actress in Supporting Role
Chhaya Debi - Arohi

Best Screenplay
Satyajit Ray - Charulata

Best Cinematography
Subrata Mitra - Charulata

Best Art Director
Banshi Chandragupta - Charulata

Best Editor
Dulal Dutta - Charulata

Best Music Director
Satyajit Ray - Charulata

Best Lyricist
Pronob Roy - Ke Tumi

Best Male Playback Singer
Manna Dey - Kanchenjungha

Best Female Playback Singer
Sandhya Mukherjee - Sandhya Deeper Sikha

Best Audiographer
Nripen Paul - Charulata

Best Dialogue
Santosh Ghosh - Kinu Goalar Gali

Hindi Section

Best Director
Raj Kapoor - Sangam

Best Actor
Dilip Raj - Shehar Aur Sapna

Best Actress
Mala Sinha - Jahan Ara

Best Actor in Supporting Role
Nana Palsikar - Shehar Aur Sapna

Best Actress in Supporting Role
Tanuja - Benazir

Best Music Director
J. P. Kaushik - Shehar Aur Sapna

Best Screenplay
K. A. Abbas - Shehar Aur Sapna

Best Lyricist
Sardar Jafri - Shehar Aur Sapna

Best Cinematographer
Radhu Karmakar - Sangam

Best Editor
Raj Kapoor - Sangam

Best Art Director
M. R. Acharekar - Sangam

Best Male Playback Singer
Mohd. Rafi - Dosti

Best Female Playback Singer
Lata Mangeshkar - Woh Kaun Thi?

Best Audiographer
Allauddin - Sangam

Best Dialogue
S. Khalil - Benazir

Foreign Film Section

Ten Best Films
 The Night of the Iguana
 West Side Story
 The Parent Trap!
 The Condemned of Altona
 Lilies of the Field
 Charade
 Five Miles to Midnight
 Hatari!
 The Leopard
 Hud

Best Director
Robert Wise and Jerome Robbins - West Side Story

Best Actor
Richard Burton - The Night of the Iguana

Best Actress
Hayley Mills - The Parent Trap!

Best Supporting Actor
Cyril Delevanti - The Night of the Iguana

Best Supporting Actress
Sue Lyon - The Night of the Iguana

See also
 27th Annual BFJA Awards
 29th Annual BFJA Awards

References

Bengal Film Journalists' Association Awards